Wajood (lit: Existence) is a 2018 Pakistani revenge thriller film co-written and directed by Jawed Sheikh. It stars Danish Taimoor and Saeeda Imtiaz in leading roles, while also featuring Aditi Singh from India, Nadeem Baig, Shahid, Ali Saleem and Jawed Sheikh himself. It was produced by Momal Sheikh and Shehzad Sheikh under the banner Jawed Sheikh Films. The film released on Eid ul-Fitr, 16 June 2018, and has been distributed by SagaHits And Music Available on Unisys Music

Cast
 Saeeda Imtiaz
 Danish Taimoor
 Javed Sheikh
 Aditi Singh
 Shahid
 Nadeem Baig
 Shaheen Khan as Mrs. Samdani
 Asad Mehmood
 Faiza Khan
 Frieha Altaf as Mrs. Shafqat
 Ali Saleem
 Iqra Memon
 Azhr Ahmd (rabia d)

Production

Development
In October 2015, Javed Sheikh announced that he is making his directional comeback with Wajood, and describes the film as "vicious adoration story". Revealing about the story Sheikh said, "I'm not saying it has maar dhaar in it, but it's not going to be your usual romantic love story. It's going to be intense and something different." The film will be produced by Sheikh's company JK Productions and line production in Turkey will be carried out by Azat Films Türkiye. In November 2015, IMGC Global Entertainment came on board as a distributor.

Casting
In July 2016, Saeeda Imtiaz and Danish Taimoor were cast in a leading roles. The character of Saeeda is "of a young Pakistani girl who is very outspoken, independent and doesn't rely on anybody to fulfill her dreams,"  and further revealed "for now, I have just signed the film with the initial details; I will get to know more about the team and the script once I'm in Pakistan." While Taimoor said, "The script is brilliant and its music also promises to be so; this is the main reason why I signed the film. And also the fact that Javed Sheikh Sahab is making his directional comeback with it. How could I have said no?" In May 2016, Frieha Altaf was cast in an unannounced role.

Filming
Principal photography is scheduled to commence in December 2016 in Pakistan, Turkey and Thailand. Javed said, "Half of the film will be shot in Pakistan and half of it will be in Turkey."

Marketing
Set to release in 2018 on Eid Ul Fitr with its trailer launch hosted at the Nueplex Cinema on 12 May 2018.

Soundtrack
The music and soundtrack of the film is composed by Sahir Ali Bagga, while some of the track will have additional musicians, Sheikh said, "The majority of the soundtrack will be composed by [Sahir Ali] Bagga but it is likely that we may also have one or two more musicians contribute their tracks to the film as well.  It is a great blend of tunes in my opinion and this was definitely a good decision”"

See also
List of Pakistani films of 2018

References

2018 films
2010s Urdu-language films
2018 action thriller films
Films about revenge
Pakistani action thriller films
Films scored by Sahir Ali Bagga